This article contains the names of public service broadcasters and their radio channels. "Public service broadcaster" is a term for a very diverse range of mass media organizations. They are maintained or owned by the government of a country, state, province or other territorial entity or by non-profit organizations. They are distinguished from commercial, community, religious and military nevrrr, which are maintained by for-profit organizations, local formal or informal communities, religious organizations, or armed forces, respectively. Typically, the broadcast area of public service broadcasters covers the entire target territory with a network of AM and/or FM transmitters. They may be financed directly by the state or by the citizens who pay licence fee. Their political programs may be balanced that serve the public or they may be propaganda outlets that serve a government. What differentiates these stations from others is that typically each country has only one public service broadcaster (or one for each language group) that offers a group of stations, typically a news/talk, a youth/music and a classical/art music station. In some countries in Latin-America there is no public service radio but there may be public service television. Many countries also maintain international, politically motivated stations that target foreign listeners: those are not listed here.

Afghanistan 
RTA - Radio Television Afghanistan

Kabul Radio FM 93 - pashtu   
 32 provincial stations

Albania 
RTSH - Radio Televizioni Shqiptar / Radio Tirana

 Radio Tirana 1 - News, talk  
 Radio Tirana 2  - Youth music  
 Radio Tirana 3  - Albanian music  
Radio Tirana Klasik - Classical

Algeria 
ENRS - Entreprise nationale de radiodiffusion sonore - Radio Algérienne

 Chaîne 1 - Arabic   
 Chaîne 2 - Berber   
 Chaîne 3 - French
 Radio Culture  - Arabic   
 Radio Coran
 48 local stations   
 Oldest Local station:  Radio Oran-El Bahia - Arabic, French

Andorra 
Ràdio i Televisió d'Andorra   

 Radio Nacional d'Andorra 
 Andorra Música

Angola 
Rádio national de Angola

 Canal A
 Rádio N'Gola Yetu
 Rádio Luanda
 Rádio FM Estéreo
 Rádio 5
 Rádio Cazenga
 Rádio Escola
Rádio Viana

Anguilla 

 Radio Anguilla

Argentina 
Radio Nacional de Argentina

 AM870 - Generic  
 R. Nacional Clasica
 R. Nacional Folclorica
 R. Nacional Rock
Radiodifusión Argentina al Exterior

Armenia 
Public Radio of Armenia

 1st Program - Առաջին ծրագիր - talk   
 Imradio My radio - Իմ ռադիո - pop    
 Yezdi radio - Եզդի ռադիո  - yazidi ethnic program   
 Arjik - Ռադիո Արևիկ* - children's program

Australia 
ABC Australian Broadcasting Corporation

 Radio National - talk 
 ABC News - all news  
 Classic FM  - classical music  
 Triple J  - pop, rock 
 Radio Grandstand - sports  
 ABC Local 54 stations 

SBS Special Broadcasting Service

 SBS 1, 2, 3, 4 - ethnic 
 SBS Arabic 24 - Arabic

Austria 
Österreichischer Rundfunk 

 Ö1 - news, culture 
 Hitradio Ö3 - pop  
 FM4 - youth, alternative  
 8 Regional channels
 Radio Slovenski - ethnic
 Radio Wien

Azerbaijan 
 Azerbaijan Radyiosu 
 Radio Respublika   
 İctimai Radio

Nakhchivan Autonomous Republic 

 Naxcivan Radio

Bahrain 
Bahrein News Agency 

 Radio Bahrain - English   
 Songs Radio - Arabic   
 Shababiya Radio - Youth  
 Holy Quran Radio

Bangladesh 
Bangladesh Betar 

 Dhaka-A Home Service 
 FM 100 - Commercial
 Traffic Channel

Belarus 
Belteleradiokompaniya - Белтелерадиокомпания  

 Radio1  -  1st channel -  Першы Нацыянальны канал Беларускага радыё 
 Radio Belarus - Беларусь - Multilingual  
 Culture - Культура-  Regional culture and music  
 Stolitsa - Сталіца - Regionl/local  
 Radius FM - youth music

Belgium

French 
RTBF - Radio Télévision Belge Francophone 

 La Première - news, talk 
 VivaCité - pop, regional news  
 Musiq3 - classical, jazz, opera  
 Classic 21 - rock, pop  
 Pure - young alt pop

Vallon 
VRT - Vlaamse Radio- en Televisieomroeporganisatie 

 Radio 1 - news, talk, culture 
 Radio 2 - pop
 Studio Brussel - young, alt pop  
 MNM - hits  
 Klara - classical music

German  
BRF - Belgischer Rundfunk 

BRF1 - speech, pop, chanson
BRF2 - pop schlager, volkstüümliche musik

Belize 
none

Benin 
ORTB - Office de Radiodiffusion et Télévision du Bénin 

 Radio Bénin - French  
 Radio Parakou - local languages
 Atlantic FM  - music

Bermuda 
BBC - Bermuda Broadcasting Company

 Bermuda Spirit
ZFB-FM
ZBM
ZBM-FM

Bhutan 
BBS - Bhutan Broadcasting Service 

 Bhutan Broadcasting Service - Dzonga, English, Sharchop, Nepali

Bolivia 
Sistema Nacional de Radiodifusión Boliviana del Estado Plurinacional de Bolivia 

 Red Patria Nueva

Bosnia and Herzegovina 
BHRT - Radio and Television of Bosnia and Herzegovina 

 BH Radio 1 

RTRS Radio Televizija Republike Srpske 

 Radio Republike Srpske

RTVFBiH - Radiotelevizija Federacije Bosne i Hercegovine 

 Federalni radio

Botswana 
Radio Botswana 

 RB1 
 RB2 (commercial)

Brazil 
EBC - Rádio Nacional 

 Rádio Nacional Brasília  - News talk pop 
 Rádio Nacional FM -  Brazilian music  
 Rádio Nacional da Amazônia - news drama music  
 Rádio Nacional do Rio de Janeiro - generalist speech  
 Rádio Nacional do Alto Solimões - news local culture  

Radio MEC (Rádio Música, Educação e Cultura) 

 Rádio MEC AM  - Brazilian music  
 Rádio MEC FM  - classical music, news  

São Paulo Government

 Rádio Cultura AM/FM - news, Brazilian music

Brunei 
RTB - Radio Television Brunei

 Nasional FM - talk 
 Pilihan FM - pop, English 
 Pelangi FM  - local 
 Harmoni FM - sports, 50-90s music, family 
 Nur Islam - religious

Bulgaria 
BNR - Bulgarsko Nacionalno Radio 

 Horizont/Програма Хоризонт - news talk music 
 Hristo Botev/Програма Христо Ботев - culture drama jazz 
 Radio Bulgaria/Радио България - international news
 9 regional channels

Burkina Faso 
RTB - Radio Télévision du Burkina

Burundi 
RTNB - Radio Television Nationale de Burundi 

 1ere chaine - French, English 
 2eme chaine - French, English

Cape Verde 
RTC - Radiotelevisão Caboverdiana

Cambodia 
RNK - Radio National of Kampuchea 

 AM 918 - khmer  
 FM 105.7 - khmer
 12 regional programs

Cameroon 
CRTV - Cameroon Radio Television 

 Poste National

Canada 
CBC - Canadian Broadcasting Corporation / Radio-Canada

English 

 CBC Radio One - English - Local and national talk
 CBC Music - English - Adult music
 CBC Radio 3 - English - Digital radio

French 

Ici Radio-Canada Première - French - Local and national talk  
 Ici Musique - French - Adult music

Catalonia
Catalunya Ràdio

 Catalunya Ràdio - generalist
 Catalunya Música - music  
 Catalunya Informació  - all news
iCat - music and culture

Central African Republic 
Radiodiffusion Television Centrafricaine

 Radio Centrafrique

Ceuta
RTVCE - Radio Televisión Ceuta 

99 FM

Chad 
RNT - Radiodiffusion Nationale Tchadienne

China 
CNR - China National Radio / 中央人民广播电台

 CNR 1 - Voice of China
 CNR 2 - Voice of Economy
 CNR 3 - Music Radio
 CNR 4 - YouRadio 
 CNR 5 - Taiwan Service 1
 CNR 6 - Taiwan Service 2
 CNR 7 - Voice of Huaxia FM (HK, Macao)
 CNR 8 - Minorities
 CNR 9 - Sounds of the Literary
 CNR 10 - Sounds of the Elderly
 CNR 11 - Tibetan Service
 CNR 12 - Entertainment Radio
 CNR 13 - Uyghur Service
 CNR Sounds of Hong Kong
 CNR Highway Traffic Radio
 CNR Sounds of China Countryside

Provincial radio 
Separate organization in each province and large city with 4-10 stations.

 Beijing
Radio Beijing Corporation
 Beijing Music Radio (FM97.4) 
 Beijing News Radio (FM100.6) 
 Beijing Story Radio (AM603)
 Beijing City Radio (FM107.3) 
 Beijing Traffic Radio (FM103.9)
 Beijing Literature and Art Broadcasting (FM87.6)
 Beijing Youth Broadcasting (FM98.2)
 Beijing Music and FM (FM94.5)
 Beijing Sports Radio (FM102.5)
 The Voice of Jingjinji (AM603)
 Beijing Foreign Language Broadcasting (AM774)
 Beijing Classical Music Radio (CFM98.6)
 Beijing Teaching Radio (CFM99.4)
 Beijing Changshu Radio (CFM104.3)
 Beijing Opera Quyi Radio (CFM105.1)
 Beijing Happy Hour Radio (CFM106.5)
 Beijing Nostalgic Golden Radio (CFM107.5)
 Tianjin
 Tianjin Television And Radio Station
 Tianjin News Radio (FM97.2)
 Tianjin Traffic Radio (FM106.8)
 Tianjin Economic Radio (FM101.4)
 Tianjin Life Radio (FM91.1)
 Tianjin Cultural Radio (FM104.6)
 Tianjin Music Broadcasting (FM99)
 Tianjin Rural Broadcasting (FM88.5)
 Tianjin Novel Broadcasting (AM666)
 Tianjin Crosstalk Broadcasting (FM92.1)
 Tianjin Binhai Broadcasting (FM87.8)
 Shanghai
 Shanghai Media Group
 Shanghai News Radio (FM93.4) 
 Shanghai Traffic Radio (FM105.7) 
 Dongguang News Channel (FM90.9) 
 Shanghai Story Radio (FM107.2)
 Driving FM (FM89.9) 
 Dynamic 101 (FM101.7)
 Love Radio (FM103.7)
 Classical 94.7 (FM94.7) 
 Digital Music Radio (KFM981)
 Shanghai Drama Broadcasting (FM97.2)
 Shanghai Five Star Sports Broadcasting (FM94.0)
First Financial Broadcasting (FM97.7)
 Pujiang Voice (AM1422)
 Chongqing
Chongqing Broadcasting Group
Chongqing News 96.8 FM
Chongqing Economic 101.5 FM
Chongqing Traffic 95.5 FM
Chongqing Music 88.1 FM
Chongqing City 93.8 FM
Chonqing Literary Radio 103.5 FM
 Anhui Province
Anhui Radio and Television Station
The Voice of Anhui
Economic Radio
Music Radio
City Voice
Traffic Broadcast
Rural Radio
Fiction Storytelling Radio
Opera Broadcasting
Travel Radio
 Fujian Province
Fujian Media Group
Fujian News Radio
South East Radio
Fujian Economy Radio
Fujian Traffic Radio
Fujian Urban Radio
Fujian Music Radio
 Guangdong Province
Guangdong Radio and Television
Radio Guangdong
Radio Guangdong News Station
Pearl Radio Economic Station
Radio Guangdong Music FM
Radio Guangdong Voice of the City
Southern Life Radio
Guanzhou Traffic News
Radio Guangdong Stock Market
U Radio Voice of Guangdong
ESFM
 Gansu province
Gansu Media Group
Gansu News Radio
Gansu Traffic Radio
Gansu Children's Radio
Gansu City FM
Gansu Economy Radio 93.4 FM
Gansu Rural Radio
 Guangxi
Guangxi People's Broadcasting Station
News 910 FM91 AM792 (Guangxi News Radio)
Female Radio 970 FM97 AM1224 (Guangxi Women Radio)
Private Car 930 FM93 (Guangxi Urban Radio)
Guangxi Music Radio FM95
Guangxi Traffic Radio FM100.3
Beibu Bay Radio FM96.3 AM846 (Shortwave Foreign Broadcasts)
 Guizhou Province
Guizhou Radio & TV
Guizhou News Radio
Guizhou Economy Radio
Guizhou Music Radio
Guizhou Urban Radio
Guizhou Traffic Radio
Guizhou Tourism Radio
Guizhou Story Radio
 Henan Province
Henan Radio Network
Henan News Radio
Henan Economic Radio
Henan Traffic Radio
Henan Music Radio
Henan Story Radio
 Hubei Province
Hubei Radio and Television
Hubei News Radio
Hubei Economy Radio
Hubei Classical Music Radio
Hubei Traffic Music Radio
Hubei Life Health Radio
Hubei Women Radio
Hubei Traffic Radio
Hubei Metro Music Radio
Hubei Information Radio
Hubei Rural Radio
 Hebei Province
Hebei Radio Network
Hebei News Radio
Hebei Economic Radio
Hebei Traffic Radio
Hebei Literary Radio
Hebei Life Radio
Hebei Music Radio
Hebei Farmers Radio
Hebei Tourism Radio
 Heilongjiang Province
Heilongjiang Radio Network
Heilongjiang News Radio
Heilongjiang Traffic Radio
Heilongjiang Life Radio
Heilongjiang Music Radio
Heilongjiang Urban Women Radio
Heilongjiang Loving Channel
Heilongjiang College Radio
Heilongjiang Korean Radio
Heilongjiang Voice of Northern Wilderness
 Hunan Province
Hunan Radio
Hunan Communication Radio 91.8FM
Hunan Economy Radio 90.1FM
Hunan News Radio 102.8FM
Hunan Music Radio 89.3FM
Hunan Modern Music Radio 97.5FM
Hunan tourism Radio 106.9FM
Hunan Life Radio 93.8FM
 Hainan
 Hainan News Radio (FM88.6) 
 Hainan Traffic Radio (FM100) 
 Hainan Music Radio (FM94.5) 
 International Tourism Island Voice (FM103.8) 
 Hainan People ’s Livelihood Radio (FM101)
 Jilin Province
Jilin Broadcasting Network
Jilin News Radio
Jilin Traffic Radio
Jilin Economic Radio
Jilin Rural Radio
Jilin Music Radio
Jilin Information Radio
Jilin Health Entertainment Radio
Jilin Tourism Radio
Jilin Educational Radio
 Jiangsu Province
Jiangsu Radio Network
Jiangsu News Radio 97.2FM
Jiangsu Traffic Radio 106.8FM
Jiangsu Life Radio 91.1FM
Jiangsu Music Radio 99.0FM
Jiangsu Economic Radio 101.4FM
Jiangsu Literary Radio 104.6FM
Jiangsu Metro Music Radio 94.5FM
 Jiangxi Province
 Inner Mongolia
 Inner Mongolia News Radio (FM95)
 Inner Mongolia Chinese News Integrated Radio (FM89)
 Inner Mongolia Traffic Voice (FM105.6)
 Inner Mongolia Music Voice (FM93.6)
 Inner Mongolia Economic Radio (FM101.4)
 Inner Mongolia Mongolian language broadcast (FM95.9)
 Inner Mongolia storytelling music broadcast (FM102.8)
 Inner Mongolia green field voice (FM91.9)
 Inner Mongolia grassland voice (FM105 )
Liaoning
Liaoning Radio and Television
Liaoning News Radio
Liaoning Economic Radio
Liaoning Literary Radio
Liaoning Traffic Radio
Liaoning Rural Radio
Liaoning Info Radio (Available in Dalian City)
 Ningxia
 Ningxia Radio and Television
Ningxia News Radio 891 AM
Ningxia Traffic Radio
Ningxia Economic Radio
Ningxia Urban Radio
 Qinghai Province
 Sichuan Province
 Sichuan Radio and Television
Sichuan Voice
Sichuan Fortune Broadcasting
Sichuan Ethnic Broadcasting
Minjiang Music Radio
Sichuan Traffic Radio
Sichuan Literature and Art Broadcasting
Sichuan News Broadcasting
City Sound
Sichuan private car radio
 Shandong
Shandong Radio & TV Station
Shandong News Radio
Shandong Economy 594 AM / 96FM
Shandong Female Anchor Radio
Shandong Life Radio
Shandong Traffic Radio
Shandong Rural Radio
Shandong Music Radio
Shandong Sports Radio
 Shaanxi Province
 Shanxi
Shanxi Radio and Television
Shanxi News Radio (90.4 FM)
Shanxi Economic Radio (95.8 FM)
Shanxi Art and Culture Radio (101.5 FM)
Shanxi Traffic Radio (88.0 FM)
Shanxi Health Radio (105.9 FM)
Shanxi Rural Radio (603 AM)
Shanxi Music Radio (94.0 FM)
 Xinjiang
 Xinjiang Integrated Radio Sunshine 895 (FM89.5)
 Xinjiang News Radio (FM96.1)
 Xinjiang Traffic Radio (FM94.9)
 Xinjiang Story Radio (FM102.8)
 Xinjiang Private Car Radio (FM92.9)
 Xinjiang Music Broadcasting (FM103.9)
 Xinjiang People's Livelihood Broadcasting (FM92.4)
 Xinjiang Uyghur Integrated Broadcasting (FM101.7)
 Xinjiang Uyghur Traffic and Arts Broadcasting (FM107.4)
 Xinjiang Kazakh Broadcasting (FM98.2)
 Xinjiang Mongolian Broadcasting Xinjiang Kirgiz Broadcasting
 Tibet
 Tibetan News Comprehensive Broadcasting (FM101.6)
 Chinese News Comprehensive Broadcasting (FM93.3)
 Tibetan Kangba Broadcasting (FM103.0)
 Urban Life Broadcasting (FM98.0)
 Tibetan Science Education Broadcasting (FM106.3)
 Yunnan Province
 Yunnan News Radio (FM105.8)
 Yunnan Private Car Radio (FM88.7)
 Yunnan Traffic Radio (FM91.8)
 Yunnan Music Radio (FM97)
 Shangri-La Voice (FM99)
 Yunnan Children's Broadcasting (FM101.7)
 Yunnan Education Broadcasting (FM100)
 Yunnan National Broadcasting (SW7210)
 Yunnan International Broadcasting (SW6035)
 Zhejiang
 Zhejiang Radio and Television Group
 Zhejiang News Radio
 Zhejiang Economy 95.0 FM
 Zhejiang Culture 99.6 FM
 Zhejiang Music 96.8 FM
 Zhejiang Traffic Radio 93 FM
 ZheJiang Female Radio 104.5 FM
 ZheJiang Sound City 107

Chile 
none

Colombia 
Radio Nacional de Colombia

 Radio Nacional

Congo (Republic) 
Radiodiffusion Télévision Congolaise

 Radio Brazzaville

Costa Rica 
Radio Nacional  )

 101.5 Costa Rica Radio

Côte d'Ivoire 
RTI - Radiodiffusion Television Ivoirienne 

 La Nationale - News talk
 Fréquence 2 - Light entertainment

Croatia 
HRT - Hrvatski Radio  

 HR1
HR2
 HR3
9 regional studios
 Radio Dubrovnik

Cuba 
ICRT - Instituto Cubano de Radio y Televisión

 Radio Rebelde - news, music, sport  
Radio Progresso - entertainment 
 Radio Taíno - turism 
 Radio Reloj - all-news  
 Radio Enciclopedia - soft music  
 CMBF Radio Musical Nacional - fine music, culture  
 Provincial stations 
Radio Victoria    
 Municipal stations   
Radio Granma

Cyprus 
CyBC / RIK - Cyprus Broadcasting Corporation - Ραδιοφωνικό Ίδρυμα Κύπρου

 RIK1 Proto - Greek 
RIK2 Deftero - Turkish   
 RIK3 Trito - Greek   
 RIK4 Classic - Classical music

Cyprus North (occupied) 
BRT - Bayrak Radyo Televizyon Kurumu

Bayrak Radyosu - Generic
 Bayrak International - pop+News in foreign languages 
 Bayrak FM - pop 
 Bayrak Klasik - classical 
 Bayrak Türk Müziği - Turkish music  
 Bayrak Radyo Haber - News in foreign languages

Czech Republic 
Český rozhlas 

Radiožurnál  - pop+news
Dvojka  - pop
 Vltava - classical
 Plus
 13 regional studios

Denmark 
DR - Danmarks Radio 

 P1 - Talk 
P2 - Classical   
 P3 - Youth pop  
 P4 - Regional studios  
 P5 - Music for elderly
P6 beat - Popular music
P8 jazz - jazz

Djibouti 
RTD - Radio Television of Djibouti 

 FM91.3

Dominica 
DBS - Dominica Broadcasting Corporation 

 DBS Radio -  English
Blaze

Dominican Republic 
CERTV - Corporacion Estatal de Radio y Television 

 Dominicana FM - news talk caribbean music 
Quisqeya - Latin music   
 Radio Santo Domingo - Dominican music

DR Congo 
RTNC - Radio-Télévision nationale congolaise 

 RTNC Chaîne nationale
 RTNC Kinshasa
 RTNC Bandundu
 RTNC Bukavu
 RTNC Goma
 RTNC Kat (Lubumbashi)
 RTNC Kindu
 RTNC Kisangani
 RTNC MbujiMayi
 RTNC Mbandaka

Ecuador 
Radio Publica de Ecuador   

 Pública FM

East Timor 
RTL- Radio-Televisão Timor Leste 

 Radio Timor Leste - Tetum, Portuguese

Egypt 
ERTU - Egyptian Radio and Television Union (إتحاد الإذاعة والتلفزيون المصري Itteh'ad Al-Edhaa'a wa at-Televezyon al-Mis'ri)

General Programme Radio (إذاعة البرنامج العام)
 Voice of the Arabs (إذاعة صوت العرب) - Pan-Arab  
 Cultural Radio (إذاعة البرنامج الثقافي)
 Middle East Radio (إذاعة الشرق الأوسط)
 European Program Radio (إذاعة البرنامج الأوروبي) 
 Youth and Sports Radio (إذاعة الشباب والرياضة)
 Radio Greater Cairo (إذاعة القاهرة الكبرى)  
 Songs Radio (إذاعة الأغاني) 
 News and Music Radio (إذاعة الأخبار والموسيقى)
 Radio Masr or Egypt Radio (إذاعة راديو مصر)
 Al Qur'an al Karim Radio (إذاعة القران الكريم) 
 Educational Radio (الإذاعة التعليمية)
 Voice of Palestine (صوت فلسطين)
 North of Saaeed Radio (إذاعة شمال الصعيد)
 Nile Valley Radio (إذاعة وادي النيل)
 Middle Delta Radio (إذاعة وسط الدلتا)
 Radio Alexandria (إذاعة الإسكندرية)

El Salvador 
none

Equatorial Guinea 
Radio Nacional de Guinea Ecuatorial

 Radio 1 - Siswati   
Radio 2 - English

Eritrea 
Dimtsi Hafash Eritrea (Voice of the Broad Masses of Eritrea / ድምጺ ሓፋሽ)

 Dimtsi Hafash

Estonia 
ERR - Eesti Rahvusringhääling  

 Vikerraadio ("rainbow") - Talk 
 Raadio 2 - Pop
 Klassikaraadio - Classical
 Raadio 4 - Russian
 Radio Tallinn - news+music

Eswatini / Swaziland 
Swaziland Broadcasting and Information Services

Ethiopia 
EBC - Ethiopian Broadcasting Corporation 

 Ethiopian National Radio 93.1
FM Addis 97.1
 EBC FM 104.3

Faeroe Islands
KVF - Útvarp Føroya

Falkland Islands 
Falkland Islands Radio Service 

 Falklands Radio - English

Fiji 
FBS - Fiji Broadcasting Corporation 

 Radio One - i Taukei / Fijian  
Mirchi FM - Hindi - Hindi pop music 
 Gold FM - English - commercial - 70-90s music 
 Bula FM - Fijian - commercial  
 2day FM - English - commercial - youth pop 
 Radio Two - Hindi - news talk religion music

Finland 
YLE - Yleisradio Oy (Swedish: Rundradion Ab) 

 Yle Radio 1 - classical music, culture
 YleX - Pop, youth  
 Yle Radio Suomi   - Entertainment, news  
 Yle Puhe - News
 Yle Sámi radio - Sami  
 Yle Vega - Swedish
 Yle X3M - Swedish song

France 
Radio France 

 France Inter - generalis
France Info - news
 France Culture - cultural
 France Musique - art music
 FIP
 Le Mouv - youth music
France Bleu - regional studios

French Polynesia 
Radio France

 Polinesie 1

Gabon 
RTG - Radiodiffusion-Television Gabonaise 

Africa Radio

Gambia 

GRTS - Gambia Radio & Television Service

 Radio Gambia - English

Georgia 
GPB - Georgian Public Broadcasting (Sakartvelos Sazogadoebrivi Mauts'q'ebeli საქართველოს საზოგადოებრივი მაუწყებელი) 

 FM 102.3 - talk, news
 FM 100.9 - music

Germany 

Deutschlandradio 

 Deutschlandfunk     
 Deutschlandfunk Kultur
 Deutschlandfunk Nova

WDR - Westdeutscher Rundfunk — Cologne
 1LIVE
 WDR 2
 WDR 3
 WDR 4
 WDR 5
COSMO( Radio Bremen, rbb, and WDR)

NDR - Norddeutscher Rundfunk — Hamburg
 NDR 90,3
 NDR 1 Niedersachsen
NDR 1 Welle Nord
NDR 1 Radio MV
NDR 2
NDR Kultur
NDR Info
NDR Info Spezial
NDR Blue
NDR Plus
 N-JOY

MDR - Mitteldeutscher Rundfunk — Leipzig
MDR Sachsen
MDR Sachsen-Anhalt
MDR Thüringen
MDR Jump
MDR Kultur
MDR Aktuell
MDR Sputnik
MDR Klassik
MDR Schlagerwelt
MDR Tweens
BR - Bayerischer Rundfunk — Munich
Bayern 1
Bayern 2
Bayern 3
BR-Klassik
BR24
SWR - Südwestrundfunk — Stuttgart
SWR 1
SWR 2
SWR 3
SWR 4
DASDING
SWR Aktuell
rbb - Rundfunk Berlin-Brandenburg — Berlin
rbb 88.8
Radioeins
Antenne Brandenburg
Fritz
rbbKultur
rbb24 Inforadio
Sorbischer Rundfunk
COSMO( Radio Bremen, rbb, and WDR)

hr - Hessischer Rundfunk — Frankfurt
hr1
hr2-kultur
hr3
hr4
hr-info
YOU FM
SR - Saarländischer Rundfunk — Saarbrücken
SR 1 Europawelle
SR 2 Kulturadio
SR 3 Saarlandwelle
UnserDing
Antenne Saar
Radio Bremen — Bremen
Bremen Eins
Bremen Zwei
Bremen Vier
Bremen Next
COSMO( Radio Bremen, rbb, and WDR)

Ghana 
GBC - Ghana Broadcasting Corporation 

 Uniiq FM - Accra  
and 14 local stations

Gibraltar 
GBC - Radio Gibraltar

Greece 
ERT - Ελληνική Ραδιοφωνία Τηλεόραση - Ellinikí Radiofonía Tileórasi 

 Program 1 (Proto) - news talk  
 Program 2 (Deftero) - Greek music  
 Program 3 (Trito) - classical music arts  
 ERA Sport - sports  
 Kosmos 93.6  -world music  
 958FM - music and culture / Thessaloniki  
 102 FM Makenonia - news / Thessaloniki

Greenland 
KNR - Kalaallit Nunaata Radioa 

 KNR

Grenada 
GBN Grenada Broadcasting Network 

 Klassic radio
HOTT FM

Guadeloupe 
Radio France

 Guadeloupe 1ere

Guam 
KPRG

Guatemala 
none

Guinea 
RTG - Radio Télévision Guinéenne 

 RTG Guinee 88.5 - French

Guinea-Bissau 
TV only

Guyana 
National Communications Network (NCN)

 Voice of Guyana
 Fresh FM
 Hot FM

Haiti 
none

Holy See 
Vatican Radio / Radio Vaticana

 Multilanguage programs

Honduras 
none

Hong Kong 
RTHK - Radio Television Hong Kong 

 Radio 1 - Cantonese news talk  
 Radio 2 - Cantonese culture entertainment family music  
 Radio 3 - English news and music  
 Radio 4 - English classical music  
 Radio 5 - Cantonese Chinese opera, elderly, children, education  
 Radio 6 - Cantonese / Mandarin China Central Radio Hong Kong  
 Radio Putongha - Mandarin Economy, rebroadcasts Community Involvement Broadcasting Service (CIBS)

Hungary 
Duna Media Service (MTVA):

 Kossuth - News talk 
 Petőfi - Pop 
 Bartók - Classical 
 Dankó - Folkish 
 Nemzetiségi - Ethnic 
 Parlamenti - Parliament

Iceland 
RÚV - Ríkisútvarpið 

 RÁS1 - news talk 
 RÁS2 - pop rock 
 Rondó - online

India 
AIR - All India Radio / Akashvani 

 Vividh Bharati   
FM Gold
 FM Rainbow
Regional and local services
 Urdu Service

Indonesia 
RRI - Radio Republik Indonesia  

 RRI PRO 1 -  Regional 
 RRI PRO 2 -  Music   
 RRI PRO 3 -  News  
 RRI PRO 4 - Culture

Iran 
IRIB - Islamic Republic of Iran Broadcasting   

 Radio Iran
Radio Farhang - Culture  
 Radio Payam - Entertain.  
 Radio Quran 
 Radio Maaref - Education  
 Radio Javan - Youth  
 Radio Varzesh - Sports  
 Radio Salamat - Health  
 Radio Eghtesad - Economy  
 Radio Namayesh - Arts  
 Radio Ava - Music  
 Radio Goftogoo - Interviews  
 and tens of provincial stations

Iraq 
Al Iraqiya
 Radio Republic of Iraq
 Holy Quran Radio

Ireland 
RTÉ - Raidió Teilifís Éireann 

 Radio 1 - Speech, music 
 2FM - CHR 
 Lyric FM - Classical 
 Raidió na Gaeltachta - Irish Speech, music 
 2XM - music - online - alt rock 
 Radio 1 Extra - Intelligent speech

Isle of Man 
Manx Radio

Israel 
IPBC /KAN - Israeli public broadcasting corporation

 Kan 88 - Hebrew - Jazz  
 Kan Kol Hamusica - Hebrew - Classical  
 Kan Reka - Russian+others - Immigrant network  
 Kan Tarbut "Here is Culture" - Hebrew - talk culture  
Kan Bet - Hebrew - news current affairs  
 Kan Gimmel - Hebrew - Israeli music, news  
 Makan - Arabic   
 Kan Moreshet - Hebrew - Religious

Italy 
RAI - Radiotelevisione Italianate 

 Radio 1 - news, talk
 Radio 2 - music, entertainment
 Radio 3 - culture, classical music, concerts
 Rai Isoradio - traffic
Rai Gr Parlamento - parliament
Rai Radio 3 Classica - opera, operetta
and other digital services

Japan 
NHK - Nippon Hōsō Kyōkai 日本放送協会

Radio 1 - news, talk  
 Radio 2 - language education, foreign language news
 NHK FM - concerts, classical music

Note: online radio streams can only be accessed from a Japanese IP address

Jordan 
JRTV - Jordan Radio and Television Corporation 

 Radio Jordan 
Amman FM

Kazakhstan 
Qazaqstan Radio and Television Corporation 

 Qazaq Radiosy - Kazakh and other languages   
Radio Astana - Information, music  
 Radio Classic - Classical music  
 Radio Shalqar - Kazakh language

Kenya 
KBC - Kenya Broadcasting Corporation  

 Radio Taifa - Swahili  
English service - English 
 Coro FM - Kikuyu  
 Minto FM - Kisii  
 Mayienga FM - Luo   
 Iftiin Fm - Somali  
 Ingo FM - Luhya

Kosovo
RTK - Radio Televizioni i Kosovës 

 Radio Kosova - Albanian 
Radio Kosova 2 - Serbian, Romani, Albanian, Turkish and other languages

Kuwait 
Ministry of information/Kuwait Radio 

 Radio Kuwait 1
 Kuwait Radio 2
 Kuwait Radio Quran
 Kuwait FM
 Easy FM 92.5 
 Radio Classical Arabic 
 Radio Hona Kuwait
 Radio Shaabya
 SuperStation

Kyrgyzstan 
Kyrgyz Radiosu 

 Birinchi Radio  
 Kyrgyz Radio 
 Myn Kyal FM 
 Dostuk FM

Laos 
Lao National Radio 

 LNR Radio 1 
 LNR VIP
LNR Radio Phoenix

Latvia 
LR - Latvijas Radio 

 LR1 Latvian - talk news 
 LR2 Latvian - youth Latvian pop  
 LR3 Klasika - classical jazz  
 LR4 Doma laukums - Russian Ethnic  

 Pieci.lv - pop  
 Radio NABA - University freeform

Lebanon 
Radio Lebanon (راديو لبنان)

Lesotho 
LNBS - Lesotho National Broadcasting Service

 Radio Leshoto - Seshoto, English   
 Ultimate Radio 99.8FM - Seshoto, English - Commercial

Liberia 
LBC - Liberia Broadcasting System

 LBC

Libya 

none

Liechtenstein 

Liechtensteinischer Rundfunk

 Radio Lichtenstein

Lithuania 
LRT - Lithuanian National Radio and Television

LRT Radijas - news, talk, music 
 LRT Klasika - classical  
 LRT Opus - alternative music

Luxembourg 
Radio Letzebuerg 

 Radio 100.7

Macao 
TDM - Teledifusao de Macau

 Radio Macau - Portuguese 
 Radio Macau 澳門電台 - Chinese 
 TDM Ou Mun - Chinese 
 Canal Macau - Chinese 
 TDM Informacao - Chinese 
 TDM Desporto - Chinese 
 TDM Entretenimento - Chinese

Madagascar 
RNM Radio Madagasikara

 National Radio

Malawi 
MBC - Malawi Broadcasting Corporation 

 Radio 1 
 Radio 2

Malaysia 
RTM - Radio Televisyen Malaysia 

 Radio Klasik - Classic hits
 Nasional FM
 TraXX FM - English   
 Ai FM - Mandarin   
 Minnal FM - Indian   
 Asyik FM - Orang Asli   
 RTM Local Stations

Maldives 
Voice of Maldives 

 Raajje FM
Radio 1 (Radio Eke)
 Radio 2*

Mali 
ORTM - Office de Radiodiffusion-Télévision du Mali   
 ORTM Nationale - French, Bambara
Chiffre II

Malta 
PBS - Public Broadcasting Services

 Radiju Malta - news
 Magic Malta - music 
 Radiju Malta 2 - diverse

Mauritania 
Radio Mauritanie 

    Radio Nationale - Arabic French

Mauritius 
MBC - Mauritius Broadcasting Corporation

 Radio Maurice - Creole, French, Chinese  
Radio Maurictius -  Hindi   
 Best FM - Hindi, English   
 Kool FM - Creole, French, English   
 Taal FM-  Hindi, Bhojpuri, Chinese   
 Rodrigues AM, FM - Creole, French (local)

Mexico 
IMER - Instituto Mexicano de la Radio

 Radio Ciudadana - world music 
 Tropicalísima - salsa, cumbia, merengue 
 Opus94 - classical  
 Reactor - rock  
 Horizonte - jazz  
 Radio 7 - banda, mariachi, nortena, grupera  
 La B Grande de Mexico - bolero, balada  
 Yucatán - regional  
 Estero Istmo - regional - news
plus other regional services

Moldova 
RM - TeleRadio Moldova 

 Radio Moldova - talk 
 Radio Moldova Tineret - pop  
 Radio Moldova Musical - classical

Monaco 
 Radio Monaco

Mongolia 
MNB - Mongolian National Broadcaster (Монголын Үндэсний Олон Нийтийн Радио Телевиз) 

 Монголын радио   
 P3 ФМ 100.9
 Voice of Mongolia

Montenegro 
RTCG - Radio Televizija Crne Gore 

 RCG 
 Radio 98

Montserrat 
Radio Montserrat (ZJB)

Morocco 
SNRT - Société nationale de radiodiffusion et de télévision 

 Al Watania (red logo) (National)   
 Chaîne Inter (lilac logo)
 Al Amazighia
 Radio Mohammed VI du Quran 
 FM Casablanca
 FM Tanger
 FM Marrakech
 FM Laâyounne
 FM Fes

Mozambique 
Rádio Moçambique 

Antena Nacional  
 Emissor Provincial de Gaza 
 Emissor Provincial de Sofala 
 RM Desporto 
 Emissor Provincial de Napula

Myanmar 
MRTV - Myanmar Radio and Television 

 Cherry FM   
 Mandalay FM 
 Myanmar National Radio
 Padamyar FM 
 Pyinsawaddy FM 
 Shwe FM

Namibia 
NBC - Namibian Broadcasting Corporation 

 National FM - English  
 Funkhaus Namibia - German   
 Hartklop FM - Afrikaans   
 and 6 other language programs

Nauru 

Nauru Broadcasting Service

 Radio Nauru

Nepal 
Radio Nepal

Netherlands 
NPO - Nederlandse Publieke Omroep 

 Radio 1 - News Talk  
 Radio 2 - 70-90s pop  
 3FM - youth pop rock  
 Radio 4 - classical music

New Caledonia 
Radio France

 Nouvelle-Calédonie La Première

New Zealand 
RNZ - Radio New Zealand  

 National - news and current affairs 
 Concert - fine music
Pacific - shortwave pacific islands service
 AM Network - parliament

Nicaragua 
Radio Nicaragua

Niger 
ORTN - Office de radiodiffusion et Télévision du Niger

 Voix du Sahel

Nigeria 
FRNC - Federal Radio Corporation of Nigeria 

 FRCN HQ 
 FRCN Lagos 
 FRCN Ibadan 
 FRCN Kaduna 
 Radio 1 Lagos 
 Coal City FM Enugu South East Zonal Station

Niue 
BCN - Broadcasting Corporation of Niue

 Radio Sunshine

North Korea 
KCBS Korean Central Broadcasting Station  / Chosŏn Chungang Pangsong / 조선 중앙 방송

 KCBS Pyongyang Pangsong
 KCBS Pyongyang FM Pangsong
 KCBS Chosun Jungang Pangsong

PBS Pyongyang Broadcasting Station    (for South Korea)

Unified Echo Broadcasting Station 통일 의 메아리 방송 (for South Korea)

North Macedonia 
MRT - Makedonsko Radio - Македонско Радио 

 Radio Skopje (Radio 1) - Talk  
 Македонско Радио 2 - Music  
 Radio Maqedonisë 3 - Albanian, Roma, Turkish, Serbian

Northern Mariana Islands 
KRNM

Norway 
NRK - Norsk rikskringkasting 

 NRK P1 - regional  
NRK P1+ - adult
 NRK P2 - cultural  
 NRK P3 - youth   
NRK MP 3 - music  
NRK P3X - music  
 NRK P13 - rock and indie music  
NRK Jazz - jazz
NRK Klassisk - classical music
 NRK Sapmi - Sami   
 NRK Alltid Nyheter - all news   
 NRK Super - children   
 NRK Folkemusikk - folk   
NRK Stortinget - Storting  
 NRK Sports - sport

Oman 
Sultanate of Oman Radio 

 FM General الإذاعة العامة   
 Holy Quran Radio إذاعة القرآن الكريم
 Youth Radio إذاعة الشباب
 English Radio الإذاعة الإنجليزية
 The voice of Oman صوت عمان

Pakistan 
Radio Pakistan 

 Saut-ul-Quran
 Islamabad Station
 NCAC
 World Service
 Hyderabad
 External Service
 Dhanak
 FM-93-Faisalabad
 Faisalabad-FM-101
 FM 93 Rawalpindi
 FM 101 Islamabad
 FM 101 Mirpur
 FM 101 Karachi
 FM 101 Peshawar
 FM-101-Lahore
 FM 101 Quetta
 Mianwali
 Peshawar
 Quetta
 Lahore-MW
 AK-RADIO-MIRPUR
 AK-RADIO-Tarakhel
 PBC Gilgit (MW)

Palau 

T8AA (AM)

T8AA-FM

Palestine 
Palestinian Broadcasting Corporation

 Voice of Palestine

Gaza 

 AlAqsa (Hamas)

Panama 

none

Papua New Guinea 
NBC/PNG - National Broadcasting Corporation of Papua New Guinea

 NBC Radio PNG

Paraguay 
Radio Nacional de Paraguay 

 Asucion 920 
 Asuncion 95.1 
 Pilar 700 
 San Pedro 105.5

Peru 
IRTP 

 Radio Nacional del Perú

Philippines 
PBS - Philippine Broadcasting Service 

DZRB Radyo Pilipinas 1 738 kHz Manila - news, talk, current affairs, information, music, entertainment
 DWFO Republika FM1 87.5 Manila - 
 DWFT Capital FM2 104.3 MHz Manila
 DZRM Radyo Magasin 1278 KHz
 DZSR Radyo Pilipinas Dos 918 KHz
 FM1 Davao 87.9 MHz

Poland 
Polskie Radio 

 Program 1 Jedynka - information and adult contemporary music
 Program 2 Dwójka - classical music and cultural 
 Program 3 Trójka - rock, alternative, jazz, and eclectic
Polskie Radio 24 (PR24) – news 
Digital
 Program 4 (Czwórka – Four) – youth oriented 
 Polskie Radio Chopin – Polish classical music 
 Polskie Radio Dzieciom – children programming (daytime), parents magazines (evenings) and Jazz music (nights) 
 Polskie Radio Rytm – pop music 
 17 regional radio stations
 Warszawa (Polskie Radio RDC)
 7 city stations

Portugal 
RTP - Rádio e Televisão de Portugal 

 Antena 1
 Antena 2
 Antena 3
 África
 Acores 
 Madeira 
Digital: Zigzag - children

Puerto Rico 
Puerto Rico Public Broadcasting Corporation
WIPR (AM) - News, talk
WIPR-FM
WRTU

Qatar 
QMC - Qatar General Broadcasting and Television Corporation 

 Qatar Radio   
 QBS FM 
 Holy Quran Radio
 Oryx FM French
 Urdu Radio

Réunion 
Radio France

 Réunion La Première

Romania 

Radio România

 Actualități  
 Cultural
 Muzical
 Regional studios
 Radio București FM
 Radio Cluj
 Radio Constanța
 Radio Iași
 Radio Oltenia Craiova
 Radio Târgu Mureș
 Radio Reșița
 Radio Timișoara
 Radio Vacanța
 Antena Satelor - rural
 Digital: E-teatru  radio drama

Russia 
VGRTK - Всероссийская государственная телевизионная и радиовещательная компания

 Radio Rossii/Радио России  - Talk, news
 Radio Mayak/Маяк - Music, talk, youth program
 Vesti FM/Вести FM  - All news
 Radio Kultura/Радио Культура - Culture
 Radio Yunost/Радио Юность (ЮFM)  - Youth

The Russian State TV and Radio Music Centre - Российский государственный музыкальный телерадиоцентр

 Radio Orfey - Classical music

Rwanda 
RBA - Rwanda Broadcasting Agency

   Radio Rwanda Fm100.7 -  Kinyarwanda, French, English, Kiswahili   

 Regional stations:
 Magic FM Kigali
 Radio Rubavu
 Radio Nyagatare
 Radio Inteko
 Radio Huye
 Radio Musanze
 Radio Rusizi

Saint Barthelemy    
Radio France
 Guadeloupe La Première
Radio St. Barth

Saint Helena 
SAMS - South Atlantic Media Services

 SAMS Radio 1

Saint Kitts & Nevis    

ZIZ - National Broadcasting Corporation of St. Kitts & Nevis

Saint Lucia

Radio St. Lucia (closed)

Saint Martin
Radio France
 Guadeloupe La Première
Radio Saint Martin 101.5 Fm

Saint Pierre & Miquelon

Radio France
Saint-Pierre et Miquelon la première

Samoa 
SBC - Samoa Broadcasting Corporation

 SBC Radio 1 - Samoan
 SBC-FM, 88.1FM - English

San Marino 
San Marino RTV
 Radio San Marino 
 Radio San Marino Classic

Sao Tome & Principe 
Radio Nacional São Tomé

Saudi Arabia 
SBA Radio Ryad Saudi Broadcasting Authority

 Riyadh Radio - General 
 Jeddah Radio - General 2nd  
 Saudia Radio  
 International Radio 
 Quran Radio 
 Neda Radio (Call of Islam Mecca) 
 Virgin Radio Saudi Arabia 
 RadioSunna

Scotland
BBC Scotland
 BBC Radio Scotland
 BBC Radio nan Gàidheal

Senegal 
RTS - Radiodiffusion Télévision Sénégalaise

 Chaîne nationale
 Radio Sénégal Internationale (RSI) 
 Dakar FM
 Regional stations
 Djourbel FM
 Fatick FM
 Kaolack FM
 Kolda FM
 Louga FM
 Matam FM
 Saint Louis FM
 Tamba FM
 Touba FM
 Thiès FM
 Ziguinchor FM

Serbia 
RTS - Radio televizija Srbije—Radio Belgrade 
 Radio Beograd 1/РАДИО БЕОГРАД 1  - news talk
 Radio Beograd 2/РАДИО БЕОГРАД 2 - arts, culture, jazz
 Radio Beograd 3/РАДИО БЕОГРАД 3 - classical music, radio drama
 Beograd 202/БЕОГРАД 202 - pop

Vojvodina 
Радио Телевизија Војводине - Radio Televizija Vojvodine

 Novi Sad 1 -  Serbian  
Vajdasági rádió és televízió - Novi Sad 2 - Hungarian   
 Novi Sad 3 - Croatian, Slovak, Rusyn, Romanian and Romany

Seychelles  
SBC - Seychelles Broadcasting Corporation

Sierra Leone   
Sierra Leone Broadcasting Corporation

Singapore 
Mediacorp

 Ria 89.7FM - Malay - Top 40 (CHR) 
 Gold 905 - English - Classic hits  
 Symphony 924 - English - Classical  
 YES 933 - Chinese Top 40 (CHR)  
 CNA938 - English - Talk radio  
 Warna 94.2FM - Malay - News, infotainment 
 Class 95 - English - Adult contemporary  
 Capital 95.8FM - Chinese - Talk radio  
 Oli 96.8FM - Tamil - Infotainment  
 Love 97.2FM - Chinese - Easy listening  
 987FM English - Top 40 (CHR)

Sint Maarten    

NPO - Nederlandse Publieke Omroep

Slovakia 
RTV - Rozhlas a televízia Slovenska

 Rádio Slovensko - Talk news
 Rádio Devín- Classical, jazz 
 Rádio FM- rock 
 Rádio Patria - Hungarian Full service 
Regional
 Rádio Regina Bratislava
 Rádio Regina Banská Bystrica
 Rádio Regina Košice 
 Junior - online - children

Slovenia 
RTV Slovenija

 Prvi  - news talk
 Ars 
 Radio Caprodista 
 Radio Si 
 Val 202
 Radio Koper
 Radio Maribor 
 Muravidéki Magyar Rádió  MMR - Hungarian

Solomon Islands 
 SIBC

Somalia 
 State Radio Muqdisho
Somali Broadcasting Corporation
 Boosaaso FM
 Garowe Studio FM 
 Gardo Studio FM
 Burao Studio FM 
Somali National Army Radio

SNA Radio 90.7

Somaliland 
Radio Hargeysa

South Africa 
SABC - South African Broadcasting Corporation

 Radio2000 - English   
 5FM - English   
 Metro FM - English  
 SaFM - English   
 Good Hope FM - English/Afrikaans   
 Tru FM - English/Xhosa   
 RSG - Afrikaans   
 Ukhozi FM - Zulu   
 8 regional languages 
 Lotus FM - English/Hindi

South Korea 
KBS - Korean Broadcasting System   
 KBS Radio 1 - News, talk, drama  
 KBS Radio 2 - Pop  
 KBS Radio 3 - For disabled  
 KBS 1FM - Classical, folk  
 KBS 2FM - Pop  
 KBS Hanminjok Radio - Ethnic

South Sudan 
United Nations

 Miraya

Spain 
RNE - Radio Nacional de España  

 Radio Nacional -  Talk  
 Radio Clásica - Classical  
 Radio 3 - Youth  
 Radio 4 - Catalan Regional  
 Radio 5 - All news  

Provincial media organizations

 Castilla-La Mancha Media – Castilla–La Mancha  
 CMM
 Corporació Catalana de Mitjans Audiovisuals – Catalonia    
 Catalunya Radio
 Catalunya Informació
 CatMúsica
 Corporación Aragonesa de Radio y Televisión – Aragon Aragón Radio 
 Corporación Radio e Televisión de Galicia – Galicia  (web)
 Corporació Valenciana de Mitjans de Comunicació – Valencia 
 À Punt FM 
 EITB – Basque Country  
 Euskadi Irratia
 Radio Euskadi 
 Radio Vitoria
Ens Públic de Radiotelevisió de les Illes Balears – Balearic Islands 
Mallorca
 Menorca 
 Pitiüses  
Radio Televisión Canaria – Canary Islands 
RTVC
Radiotelevisión de la Región de Murcia – Murcia 
RTP Radiotelevisión del Principado de Asturias – Asturias  
RPA Radio
RTVM - Radio Televisión Madrid – Madrid  
Onda Madrid

Sri Lanka 
SLBC - Sri Lanka Broadcasting Corporation

 Radio Sri Lanka - Sinhalese 
 Sinhala National Service - Sinhalese 
 City FM 
 Valanda Seva Sinhala - Commercial Service - Sinhalese   
 Thendral - Tamil - commercial  
 Tamil National Service - Tamil  
 Kandurata FM  - Local  
 Asia Service 
 Rajata

Sudan 
SRTC

Suriname 

 Radio SRS Suriname - commercial

Sweden 
SR - Sveriges Radio

 P1 - intelligent speech  
 P2 - art music, jazz, folk   
 P3 - youth channel   
 P4 Stockholm and ca 30 other regions  local, adult mix  
 Sveriges Radio Finska - Finnish   
 SR Sápmi - Sami   
 EKOT - all-news

Switzerland

German 
SRF - Schweizer Radio und Fernsehen

 SRF 1
 SRF 2 Kultur
 SRF 3
 SRF4 News

SRF Musikwelle
SRF Virus

French 
RTS - Radio Télévision Suisse

 La 1ére
 Espace2
 Couleur3
 Option Musique

Italian 
RSI - Radiotelevisione Svizzera

 Rete Uno
Rete Due 
Rete Tre

Romansh 
RTR - Radiotelevisiun Svizra Rumantscha
 Radio Rumantsch

Syria 
ORTAS - General Organization of Radio and TV Syria 

 Radio Dimshq

Taiwan 
FHBS - Fuxing Broadcasting Station

 FHBS Radio 1

Ministry of Defense 

 Voice of Han

NER - National Education Radio (國立教育廣播電臺)

PRS - Police Radio Station (警察廣播電台)

TBS - Taipei Broadcasting Station (台北廣播電台)  

KBS - Kaohsiung Broadcasting Station (高雄廣播電台)

Tajikistan 
TeleRadioCom

 Radio Tojik 
 Radio Farhang 
 Ovozi Tojik 
 Sadoi Dushanbe

Tanzania 
TBC - Tanzania Broadcasting Corporation

 TBC FM
 TBC Taifa

Thailand 
MCOT

 MCOT Radio   
 Labour's Radio   
 Lukthung Mahanakhon 
 Khluen Khwam Khit  96.50 MHz 
 Seed FM  97.50 MHz - Thai, English   
 Active FM  99.00 MHz  
 News Network   100.50 MHz  
 Met 107 - English   
 Eazy FM - Thai, English

Radio Thailand
 AM 819 kHz
 AM 891 kHz
 Educational Radio and Emergency Alerts AM 1467 kHz
 FM 88.0 MHz
 FM 92.5 MHz
 FM 93.5 MHz
 FM 95.5 MHz
 FM 97.0 MHz
 FM 105.0 MHz
 World Service

Togo 
Radio Lomé 

   Radio Lomé

Tokelau    
Radio Tokelau

RNZ - Radio New Zealand

Tonga 
TBC Tonga Broadcasting Commission

 Radio Tonga

Trinidad and Tobago 
Caribbean New Media Group

 Talk City 91.1

Tunisia 
Radio Tunisienne 

 Radio Nationale
 Radio Culture 
 Radio Jeunes
 Radio Tunis Chanine Internationale
 5 local stations

Turkey 
TRT - Turkish Radio and Television Corporation/Turkey Radyo ve Televizyon Kurumu

 Radyo 1 - Talk  
 TRT FM - Turkish pop  
 Radyo 3 - Jazz, classical  
 Radyo Nağme - Turkish art music  
 Radyo Türkü - Turkish Folk music  
 Radio haber  - news  
 Kurdi - Kurd
Voice of Turkey - radio network

Turkmenistan 
TR / Türkmentelekom

 TR1 Watan
 TR2 Çar Tarapdan
 TR3 Miras
 TR4 Owaz

Turks and Caicos 
RTC 

 Radio Turks and Caicos RTC

Tuvalu 
Tuvalu Media Corporation  (web)

 Radio Tuvalu

U.S. Virgin Islands  
PBS
 WTJX-FM

Uganda 
UBC - Uganda Broadcasting Corporation

 UBC Radio Uganda 
 Red Channel
 Blue Channel
 Star FM
 Magic 100 
 Mega FM

Ukraine 
UR - Ukrainske Radio

 UR-1 Ukrainian Radio Українське радіо 
 UR-2 Promin Радіо Промінь (ray) 
 UR-3 Kultúra Радіо Культура
 Regional stations
 Carpathians
 Chernihiv wave
 Chernivtsi
 Dnipro
 Dnipro (Kryvyi Rih)
 Kharkiv
 Kherson
 Kropyvnytskyi
 Ltava
 Luhansk region
 Lutsk
 Lviv
 Mykolaiv
 Odesa
 Podillya-Center
 Pulse
 Radio Zhytomyr Wave
 Rivne
 Ros
 Sumy
 Ternopil
 The voice of Donbass
 Tisa-FM
 Uzhhorod
 Vinnytsia
 Voice of Kyiv
 Zaporizhzhia
 Zhytomyr wave

United Arab Emirates   
Abu Dhabi Media

 Abu Dhabi FM 
Abu Dhabi Classic FM - western Classical, Jazz and Chill Out
 Emarat FM -  entertainment 
 Quran Kareem Radio 
 Radio Mirchi - Indian station's local version
 Star FM - youth music
Radio 1 - top 40
Radio 2 - feel good music

United Kingdom 
BBC - British Broadcasting Corporation

 BBC Radio 1 - CHR
 BBC Radio 2 - AC/AOR entertainment
 BBC Radio 3 - Classical music, jazz, drama, arts
 BBC Radio 4 - News, talk, and drama
 BBC Radio 5 - Live News and sport
 BBC Radio 1Xtra - Electronica, hip hop, R&B, soul
 BBC Radio 4 Extra - Comedy, Drama, Entertainment
 BBC Radio 5 Live Sports Extra - Sport
 BBC Radio 6 Music - Alternative/Indie music
 BBC Asian Network - British Asian Music, News & Entertainment
 BBC World Service
Regional services
 BBC Radio Scotland
 BBC Radio Nan Gàidheal
 BBC Radio Shetland
 BBC Radio Orkney
 BBC Radio Wales
 BBC Radio Cymru
 BBC Radio Ulster
 BBC Radio Foyle
 Local services
BBC Essex
 BBC Radio Cambridgeshire
 BBC Radio Norfolk
 BBC Radio Northampton
 BBC Radio Suffolk
 BBC Three Counties Radio
 BBC Radio Derby
 BBC Radio Leicester
 BBC Radio Nottingham
 BBC Radio London
 BBC Radio Newcastle
 BBC Radio Cumbria
 BBC Radio Tees
 BBC Radio Lancashire
 BBC Radio Manchester
 BBC Radio Merseyside
 BBC Radio Berkshire
 BBC Radio Oxford
 BBC Radio Solent
 BBC Radio Kent
 BBC Radio Surrey
 BBC Radio Sussex
 BBC Radio Guernsey
 BBC Radio Cornwall
 BBC Radio Devon
 BBC Radio Jersey
 BBC Radio Bristol
 BBC Radio Gloucestershire
 BBC Radio Somerset
 BBC Radio Wiltshire
 BBC Radio WM
 BBC CWR (was BBC Coventry & Warwickshire)
 BBC Hereford & Worcester
 BBC Radio Shropshire
 BBC Radio Stoke
 BBC Radio Leeds
 BBC Radio Sheffield
 BBC Radio York
 BBC Radio Humberside
 BBC Radio Lincolnshire

United States 
The USA government maintains two groups of stations for external broadcasting (Voice of America and Radio Liberty and its sister stations) plus the American Forces Network.

National Cable Satellite Corporation

 WCSP-FM / C-SPAN radio - proceedings of the United States federal government, and public affairs

NPR - National Public Radio  (nonprofit, NGO)

 NPR programs are relayed by state or local public broadcasters. All member stations are listed here.

PRI - Public Radio International  (nonprofit, NGO)

 PRI programs are relayed by state or local public broadcasters

Public broadcasters

The outputs of these broadcasters are aired in several local stations. Some broadcasters form a group of FM and/or HD stations, consisting of talk/news and jazz/classical stations.

 Arkansas Public Media
 California
KQED North and Central California
 California Southern California Public Radio
 Capital Public Radio
 Valley Public Radio
 California Local Public Radio - KALW
 Colorado Public radio
 Connecticut Public radio
 Delaware Public Media - WDDE
 Florida
 Florida Public Radio Network
 Florida Public Media
 Georgia Public Broadcasting
 Hawai'i Public radio
 Idaho
 Boise State Public Radio
 Illinois 
NPR Illinois
 Public Media WILL
Northern Public Radio WNIJ
Illinois Public Radio - WSIU
 Chicago's NPR WBEZ
 Indiana Public Radio - WBST
Indianapolis Public Radio - WFYI
Indiana Public Media - WFIU
 Iowa Public radio
 Kansas Public radio
 Kentucky Public radio
 Louisiana
 WWNO - New Orleans Public Radio
 Red River Radio
 Louisiana Public Broadcasting
 Maine Public
 Maryland Public radio stations
 Massachusetts: New England Public Radio
 Michigan Radio
 Minnesota Public radio
 Mississippi Public Broadcasting
 Missouri: St Louis Public Radio
 Montana Public radio
 Nebraska: KUCV
 Nevada Public radio - KNPR
 New Hampshire Public radio
 New Jersey Public radio - NJPR
 New Mexico
New Mexico Public radio - KANW
 KRWG Public media for southwestern New Mexico and Far West Texas
 KENW Public radio for Eastern New Mexico and West Texas
 New York Public radio - WNYC
 North Carolina Public radio - WUNC
North Carolina: Blue Ridge Public Radio (western North Carolina)
 Prairie Public Radio (North Dakota)
Ohio
WKSU Northeast Ohio
WOSU Regional Radio Network
 Ohio Public radio - WCBE
 Oklahoma: KOSU
 Oregon Public Broadcasting
 Pennsylvania: WPSU Penn State (central Pennsylvania)
 Rhode Island: RIPR - The Public's Radiiiiio
 South Carolina Public radio
 South Dakota Public Broadcasting
 Tennessee: Nashville Public Radio - WPLN
 Texas Public radio - KSTX
 Utah Public radio
 Vermont Public radio
 Virginia: WMRA Public Radio of the Shenandoah Valley
 Washington: Northwest Public Broadcasting
 West Virginia Public radio
 Wisconsin Public radio
 Wyoming Public Media
Washington DC: WAMU - American University Radio

Uruguay 
Radiodifusión Nacional del Uruguay

 Clásica 650 AM
 Radio Uruguay
 Emisora del Sur
 Babel FM

Uzbekistan 
MTRK - O'zbekiston Milly Teleradioompaniyasi

 O'zbekiston 
 Toshkent 
 Mahalla  - Society  
 Yoshlar - Youth

Vanuatu 

VBTC - Vanuatu Broadcasting & Television Corporation
 Radio Vanuatu
 Paradise FM
 Femme pawa FM

Venezuela 
RNV - Radio Nacional de Venezuela

 Canal Informativo 
 Juvenil (Activa) 
 Canal Clasico 
 Canal Musical 
 Canal Indigena 
 5 Radio Local

Vietnam 
VoV - Voice of Vietnam

 VOV1  - News  
 VOV2  - Culture  
 VOV3  - Music  
 VOV4  - Ethnic

Wallis & Futuna 

Radio France
 Wallis et futuna la première

Western Sahara 
SNRT Société Nationale de Radiodiffusion et de Télévision 

 Al Idaâ Al-Watania 
 Al Idaâ Al Amazighia
 Quran
 Chaîne Inter
Radio national de LA R.A.S.D (الإذاعة الوطنية للجمهورية العربية الصحراوية)

Yemen 
Yemen General Corporation for Radio & TV

 Sana'a Radio 
 Aden Radio

Zambia 
ZNBC - Zambia National Broadcasting Corporation

 Radio 1 - Bemba, tonga, nyanja, lozi, kaonder, luvale 
 Radio 2 - English
 Radio 4 - Music

Zimbabwe 
ZBC - Zimbabwe Broadcasting Corporation

 Classic 263 - English talk & old school
 Radio Zimbabwe - Ndebele & Shona
Power FM - youth music
 National FM - 14 local languages
Khulumani FM - Matabeleland region
 95.8 Central Radio - Midlands region

References

Lists of radio stations